Joan of Valois may be:

 Joan of Valois, Countess of Hainaut (1294–1352)
 Joan of Valois, Countess of Beaumont (1304–1363)
 Joan of Valois, Queen of Navarre (1343–1373)
 Joan of France, Duchess of Brittany (1391–1433)
 Joan of Valois, Duchess of Alençon (1409–1432)
 Joan of France, Duchess of Bourbon (1435–1482)
 Jeanne de Valois, Dame de Mirabeau (1447–1519), illegitimate daughter of Louis XI of France, by Félizé Regnard; legitimated in 1466, and married to Louis de Bourbon, comte de Roussillon 
 Joan of France, Duchess of Berry (1464–1505)
 Joan of Valois (stillborn 1556), daughter of Catherine de' Medici
 Jeanne de Valois-Saint-Rémy (1756–1791)